Scotorythra euryphaea is a moth of the family Geometridae. It was first described by Edward Meyrick in 1899. It is endemic to the Hawaiian islands of Kauai, Oahu, Molokai and Maui.

The larvae probably feed on Metrosideros species.

External links

E
Endemic moths of Hawaii
Biota of Kauai
Biota of Maui
Biota of Oahu